Miguel Casas (7 August 1920 – 6 November 2003) was a Spanish cyclist. He won the Volta a Catalunya in 1944. He also competed in the 1945 Vuelta a España, where he finished 18th overall.

Major results
1942
 1st Stage 5 Volta a Catalunya
1944
 1st  Overall Volta a Catalunya
1st Stage 4a (ITT)
 3rd Overall Vuelta a Cantabria
1945
 10th Trofeo Jaumendreu

References

1920 births
2003 deaths
Spanish male cyclists
Cyclists from Barcelona